The École nationale supérieure d'informatique pour l'industrie et l'entreprise (ENSIIE) (National School of Computer Science for Industry and Business), formerly known as Institut d'informatique d'entreprise, is a French public   specialising in computer science and applied mathematics.

Students can be admitted to ENSIIE through the selective Concours Mines-Télécom examination, after a strong competition during two years of undergraduate studies in classes préparatoires aux grandes écoles. The selection was done on the Concours Centrale-Supélec examination before 2015. Students can also be admitted through parallel admissions, coming from various IUT as well as multiplie faculties all around France, along with a number of international students through partnerships.

The school belongs to prestigious groups of institutions such as Institut Mines-Télécom, or University of Paris-Saclay (associate member).

The ENSIIE Engineering School was created by the Conservatoire National des Arts et Métiers in 1968.

Initially located in Paris, it is now in Évry (France).

In 2020, the ENSIIE benefits from a network of over 4000 Alumni, engineer who have graduated from the school under any major or type of training.

Academic studies

The admission to Institut d'Informatique d'Entreprise is made through a selective entrance examination, and requires at least two years of preparation (in Classes Préparatoires), or for non-CPGE admissions, highly selective processes including an interview. Each year, around 130~150 new students are admitted.

Courses last 3 years, and the final year can be done in a foreign university, such as the University of Manchester (UK), Oxford University (UK), Aston University (UK), Université de Sherbrooke (Canada). 
Some of these collaborations will enable the student to obtain both the ENSIIE degree and the master's degree of the host university.

There also exist multiple partnerships with other international universities that do not involve a double degree in which the students can take a part of. The full list can be found on the official website.

The studies are divided into three major components:
 Computer Science: Programming, Databases, Multimedia, Artificial Intelligence, Computer Networks, Hardware, Robotics, Cybersecurity, Video Game Design, Virtual Reality...
 Mathematics: Data Science, Operational Research, Formal Methods, Finance, Probabilities, ...
 Economics & Management: Management, Entrepreneurship
Some Humanities topics are added: Languages (students have to successfully pass the TOEIC before the end of their studies), Epistemology, ...

A considerable amount of time (11 months during the whole studies) is spent working in companies or research laboratories, corresponding to 3 internships: 2 months at the end of the 1st year, 3 months at the end of the 2nd year, and 6 months at the end of the 3rd year.

The ENSIIE also offers a dual education system, where students enrolled, generally admitted through IUT and parallel admissions, alternate between working in a company and attending school, on the basis of 2/3 days a week for each of those activities.

In addition to these two trainings, the ENSIIE offers a Continuing education path for more experienced professionals (over 3 years of experience in IT and also holding a degree) who want to benefit from an advanced diploma.

Notable alumni 
 Christophe Devine (2003), inventor of the software Aircrack and XySSL

References

External links
  Official website of the ENSIIE
  Links with foreign universities
  Main website
 (in French) Student's Union website
  Students' website

Grandes écoles
Engineering universities and colleges in France
Educational institutions established in 1968
1968 establishments in France